Tuulilasi (Finnish: Windscreen) is one of the biggest automobile magazines published in Helsinki, Finland. It has been in circulation since 1963.

History and profile
Tuulilasi has been published since 1963 by A-lehdet Oy as of 2009 the third publisher in the country. The magazine is published 16 times per year. It has its headquarters in Helsinki.

In 2007 the circulation of Tuulilasi was 86,000 copies. In 2009 the magazine had a circulation of 80,000 copies and a readership of about 500,000. In 2010 it fell to 77,895 copies. The 2011 circulation of the magazine was 78,432 copies. It fell to 68,748 copies in 2012 and 62,476 copies in 2013.

See also
 List of magazines in Finland

References

External links
Official website

1963 establishments in Finland
Automobile magazines published in Finland
Finnish-language magazines
Magazines established in 1963
Magazines published in Helsinki